Béla Lajta (until 1907 Béla Leitersdorfer) (Óbuda, 23 January 1873 – Vienna, 12 October 1920) was a prominent Hungarian architect.

Career 

Lajta finished his degree at the Budapest Technical University and worked briefly under Alajos Hauszmann before spending one and a half years in Italy, mainly Rome. During that time, he also worked in painting and sculpture. After this he worked in Berlin and London. He returned home in 1899 to take part in a competition to design a synagogue which he won first prize in. His first work in 1900 was the Bard music shop on Kossuth Lajos street, finished in 1900. Ödön Lechner was a notable influence on him at this time. They worked together on a number of projects, namely the Kozma Street Cemetery's Schmidl crypt. He designed a number of buildings in the Hungarian offshoot style of Art Nouveau, called szecesszió in Hungarian, the most notable being Rózsavölgyi house in Budapest on Szervita square. 

In 1909 he designed, in an Art Deco style the Parisiana, Paulay Ede utca, Budapest, now New Theatre (Új színház). 

After a serious illness he died at a comparatively young age.

External links 
 Béla Lajta Virtual Archives 

1873 births
1920 deaths
Hungarian architects
Hungarian Jews
Jewish architects
People from Óbuda